Luostari is the name of several rural localities in Russia and an airbase:
Luostari (inhabited locality), an inhabited locality along  between Nikel and Pechenga in Korzunovsky Territorial Okrug of Pechengsky District of Murmansk Oblast.  One of the most northerly monasteries in the world, the Trifonov Pechengsky monastery, is there.
Luostari (railway station), an inhabited locality classified as a railway station in Korzunovsky Territorial Okrug of Pechengsky District of Murmansk Oblast
Luostari/Pechenga, an airbase west of the Pechenga River and near  at Korzunovo in Pechengsky District of Murmansk Oblast near the Norwegian border.  It is south south-west of the Trifonov Pechengsky monastery.  Yuri Gagarin was stationed here.

See also
 Putevaya Usadba 9 km zheleznoy dorogi Luostari–Nikel